Razboyna Glacier is the  long and  wide glacier in Petvar Heights on the southeast side of Sentinel Range in Ellsworth Mountains, Antarctica situated north of Drama Glacier, east of Kornicker Glacier, and south of the lower course of Thomas Glacier.  It is draining the north slopes of Bagra Peak, and flowing northeastwards to leave the range north of Long Peak.

The feature is named after the settlements of Razboyna in northeastern and southeastern Bulgaria.

Location
US mapping in 1988.

See also
 List of glaciers in the Antarctic
 Glaciology

Maps
 Vinson Massif.  Scale 1:250 000 topographic map.  Reston, Virginia: US Geological Survey, 1988.
 Antarctic Digital Database (ADD). Scale 1:250000 topographic map of Antarctica. Scientific Committee on Antarctic Research (SCAR). Since 1993, regularly updated.

References
 Razboyna Glacier SCAR Composite Antarctic Gazetteer
 Bulgarian Antarctic Gazetteer. Antarctic Place-names Commission. (details in Bulgarian, basic data in English)

External links
 Razboyna Glacier. Copernix satellite image

Glaciers of Ellsworth Land
Bulgaria and the Antarctic